is a Japanese manga series created by Ai Morinaga. The manga series, published by Kadokawa Shoten, ran from 1996 to 2000 with a total of fourteen volumes. After the regular series ended the author came out with another special volume about the other siblings within the Yamada Family called The Tale of the Yamada Family. A Japanese television drama series adaptation was broadcast in 2007.

Plot summary
Tarō Yamada is smart, athletic, and very handsome. He seems perfect on the outside, but he's actually dirt poor due to his mother's reckless spending habits and his always-gone father. Although never once does he admit it, everyone at school thinks he is a very humble rich boy because of his good looks. However, at home, he must care for his six younger siblings, who share a one-bedroom place with him and his mother.

Live-action drama

Taiwanese TV drama

The manga was adapted into a 45-episode Taiwanese drama titled Poor Prince starring Vic Zhou, Ken Chu, Annie Yi, Edward Ou and Will Liu. It was produced by Comic Ritz International Production (可米瑞智國際藝能有限公司) and Angie Chai (柴智屏) as producer. It was broadcast in Taiwan on free-to-air Chinese Television System (CTS) (華視) from 11 August to 8 November 2001.

Japanese TV drama
山田太郎ものがたり / Yamada Tarō Monogatari : Tale of Yamada Tarō
From July to September 2007, Japanese television network TBS aired a dramatization of the story, starring Kazunari Ninomiya as Tarō and Shō Sakurai as Takuya, Tarō's wealthy best friend who occasionally offers Taro a helping hand. The Japanese version of the drama has received higher ratings and is generally more popular than the Taiwanese version. The opening theme song is "Happiness" by Arashi, the Japanese musical group, which the two stars are members of.

References

External links 
Official Website of "Yamada Taro Monogatari"  on TBS
 

1996 manga
Ai Morinaga
Kadokawa Shoten manga
Kadokawa Dwango franchises
Kin'yō Dorama
2007 Japanese television series debuts
2007 Japanese television series endings
2000 comics endings
Manga adapted into television series